Allium rosenbachianum is a plant species found high in the Himalayas of Pakistan, Afghanistan, Kyrgyzstan and Tajikistan and cultivated in many other regions as an ornamental. It is a perennial herb with bulbs up to 30 mm across. Scape is up to 100 cm tall, with a spherical umbel of many reddish-purple flowers with long pedicels.

References

rosenbachianum
Onions
Flora of Tajikistan
Flora of Afghanistan
Flora of Pakistan
Flora of Kyrgyzstan
Plants described in 1884